Jonathan Kamakawiwoʻole Osorio is a Native Hawaiian professor of Hawaiian studies. He is the Dean of the Hawaiʻinuiākea School of Hawaiian Knowledge at the University of Hawaiʻi at Mānoa.

Early life and education 
Osorio was born in Hilo. While attending Kamehemeha Schools he learned to play the guitar. He graduated in 1969.

Career 
In 1974 he formed a duo called "Jon & Randy" with fellow musician Randy Borden. Their song "Hawaiian eyes" won a Na Hoku Hanohano award in 1981.

In 1984 Osorio returned to school. He earned a PhD in history from the University of Hawaiʻi at Mānoa. He taught Hawaiian studies at the university and Kapiʻolani Community College. He became the Dean of the Hawaiʻinuiākea School of Hawaiian Knowledge in 2018. While working as a professor, Osorio also attended protests against the Thirty Meter Telescope. Osorio's work as a professor and musician intertwine; he often sings a song during his interviews, conference presentations, forums, and other engagements. 

In 2019 he was awarded the Lifetime Achievement Award by the Hawaiʻi Academy of Recording Arts.

Bibliography

References 

People from Hilo, Hawaii
Kamehameha Schools alumni
University of Hawaiʻi at Mānoa alumni
University of Hawaiʻi at Mānoa faculty
Native Hawaiian writers
Year of birth missing (living people)
Living people